Plagiocephalus is a genus of picture-winged flies in the family Ulidiidae.

Species
P. latifrons 
 P. lobularis
 P. huberi
P. intermedius

References

Ulidiidae